Bruno Gamba (30 May 1929 – 12 March 1987) was an Italian rower. He competed in the men's coxless pair event at the 1952 Summer Olympics.

References

External links
 

1929 births
1987 deaths
Italian male rowers
Olympic rowers of Italy
Rowers at the 1952 Summer Olympics
Sportspeople from Lecco